Goetsch or Götsch is a German surname. Notable people with the surname include:

Christa Goetsch (born 1952), German politician
Ernst Gotsch (born 1948), Swiss farmer
Philip Götsch (born 1984), Italian sky runner
Robert Goetsch, American politician

German-language surnames
Surnames from given names